Barbaras were barbarians who were mentioned in the Indian epic Mahabharata, along with the Yavanas, Sakas and Kambojas.

References

Mahabharata